Al Lisaili or Al Lesaily is a desert settlement in the emirate of Dubai, United Arab Emirates (UAE) and a centre for the sport of camel racing. In 2015, the settlement had a population of 2,514.

The township, located off the Dubai/Al Ain Highway (E66), is home to the Al Marmoom Camel Racing Track and contains a large number of camel farms, breeding centres and municipal veterinary services, including the Dubai Camel Market, home to over 130 shops in a sprawl of over 32 buildings. Racing takes place at Al Lisaili between March and October, with the camels bearing automated 'auto-jockeys'. The races host competitors and visitors from around the GCC.

Lisaili is also home to a 15,000m² 'multi-species' abattoir, operated by Dubai Municipality as well as the Marmoom Heritage Village, home to the annual Al Marmoom Heritage Festival, which takes place from March to April each year. The Dubai Sevens Stadium is located just outside the village on the Dubai side. Lisaili borders the Al Marmoom Desert Conservation Reserve.

Al Lisaili is also home to the desert campus of SkyDive Dubai, the skydiving, parachuting and extreme sports club.

References 

Populated places in Dubai